Andreja Stevanović (born 9 July 1995) is a Serbian professional basketball player for ALM Évreux Basket of the LNB Pro B.

Professional career
In August 2017, Stevanović signed with Partizan. On December 21, 2017, the two sides have terminated their contract by mutual agreement. In the 2017–18 ABA League season, Stevanović played 8 games for Partizan NIS, averaging 3.4 points. The same day he returned to his former club Dynamic.

Stevanović played for Kragujevački Radnički from 2019 to 2021. During the 2020–21 season, he averaged 23.3 points, 5.4 rebounds, 4.4 assists, and 1.0 steal per game. On October 4, 2021, Stevanović signed with ALM Évreux Basket of the LNB Pro B.

References

External links
 ABA League profile
 Eurobasket profile
 RealGM profile
 Euroleague Profile

1995 births
Living people
ABA League players
Basketball League of Serbia players
Guards (basketball)
KK Borac Čačak players
KK Dynamic players
KK Napredak Aleksinac players
KK Partizan players
KK Radnički Kragujevac (2009–2014) players
KKK Radnički players
Serbian men's basketball players
Sportspeople from Kragujevac